ISO 3166-2:TM is the entry for Turkmenistan in ISO 3166-2, part of the ISO 3166 standard published by the International Organization for Standardization (ISO), which defines codes for the names of the principal subdivisions (e.g., provinces or states) of all countries coded in ISO 3166-1.

Currently for Turkmenistan, ISO 3166-2 codes are defined for 5 regions and 1 city. The city Ashgabat is the capital of the country and has special status equal to the regions.

Each code consists of two parts, separated by a hyphen. The second part is a letter.

Current codes
Subdivision names are listed as in the ISO 3166-2 standard published by the ISO 3166 Maintenance Agency (ISO 3166/MA).

Click on the button in the header to sort each column.

Changes
The following changes to the entry have been announced in newsletters by the ISO 3166/MA since the first publication of ISO 3166-2 in 1998:

See also
 Subdivisions of Turkmenistan
 FIPS region codes of Turkmenistan

External links
 ISO Online Browsing Platform: TM
 Provinces of Turkmenistan, Statoids.com

2:TM
ISO 3166-2
Turkmenistan geography-related lists